Jara is a Spanish surname, popular in various places in southern Spain, meaning rockrose or cistus.

People with the surname

Association football

Europe
Francisco Chaparro Jara (born 1942), Spanish footballer and manager
Kurt Jara (born 1950), Austrian footballer
Santi Jara (born 1991), Spanish footballer
Ginés de la Jara, Spanish Christian saint

North America
Claudio Jara (born 1959), Costa Rican footballer
Francisco Jara (born 1941), Mexican footballer
Cristóbal Magallanes Jara (1869-1927), Mexican Roman Catholic priest and saint
Geovanny Jara (born 1967), Costa Rican footballer
Fernando Jara (born 1987), Panamanian jockey
Guillermo Jara (born 1973), American football (soccer) player

South America
Ángel Jara (born 1936), Paraguayan footballer
Cristino Jara (born 1973), Paraguayan footballer
Diego Jara (born 1983), Argentinian footballer
Franco Jara (born 1988), Argentinian footballer
Gonzalo Jara (born 1985), Chilean footballer
Alan Jara (born 1957), Colombian politician kidnapped by FARC
Albino Jara (1877-1912), Paraguayan president
Gualberto Jara (born 1959), Paraguayan football manager in Chile
Leonardo Jara (born 1991), Argentinian footballer
Rodrigo Jara (born 1985), Chilean footballer
Luis Jara (singer) (born 1965), Chilean singer and actor
Max Jara (1886–1965), Chilean poet
Patricio Jara (born 1974), Chilean writer and journalist
Víctor Jara (1932-1973), Chilean teacher, theatre director, poet, singer-songwriter, and political activist
Joan Jara (born 1927), activist, widow of Victor Jara

See also
 Jara Saguier

References

Spanish-language surnames